Grimbiémont is a village of Wallonia in the municipality of Marche-en-Famenne, district of Roy, located in the province of Luxembourg, Belgium.

The village was erected as a municipality in 1796. It was merged with Lignières in 1818, this new municipality itself merged with Roy in 1823.

The village consists of several farms from the 18th and 19th centuries.

References

External links

Populated places in Luxembourg (Belgium)